Make Me Famous may refer to:
 Make Me Famous (band), a Ukrainian metalcore band
 Make Me Famous (2020 film), a British television film
 Make Me Famous (2021 film), a documentary about painter Edward Brezinski